Kips Bay Towers is a large two-building condominium complex in the Kips Bay neighborhood of Manhattan with a total of 1,118 units.  The complex was designed by architects I.M. Pei and S. J. Kessler, with the involvement of  James Ingo Freed, in the brutalist style and completed in 1965. The project was developed by Webb & Knapp.

The complex includes two residential high-rise buildings each with 20 floors. Additionally, there is a three-acre private garden between the two towers featuring landscaped lawns as well as recreational spaces. Kips Bay Towers is home to more than 4,000 residents.

History
The project, originally known as Kips Bay Plaza, was conceived as a middle-income rental project, but was converted to condominium apartments in the mid-1980s. The project was originally built as a slum clearance project under Title I of the federal Housing Act of 1949. Kips Bay Towers was built on the site of the first Phipps Houses, at 321-337 East 31st Street, designed by Grosvenor Atterbury in 1906. The Phipps family had built three six-story tenements with 142 apartments between Second and Third avenues. Phipps allowed the 31st Street houses to go in a condemnation proceeding, ultimately resulting in the construction of the Kips Bay Towers.

Architect I. M. Pei had originally wanted a large sculpture by Picasso placed in the middle of the development's park, but William Zeckendorf, the head of the development company, Webb & Knapp, told Pei that he could have either the sculpture or fifty saplings. Pei chose the trees.

In November 1981, a plan to convert Kips Bay Towers into condominiums became effective; however, the conversion was bogged down in litigation with holdout tenants. By 1984, approximately 70% of the apartments had been purchased, 50% by existing tenants and the remaining 20% by non-residents.

In the mid-1990s, J. D. Carlisle Development Corporation constructed a retail facility along Second Avenue from 30th Street to 32nd Street connected to the Kips Bay Towers complex. The retail construction was built on the site of "Kips Bay Gardens" a park and playground that was owned and operated by the Kips Bay Towers organization. Kips Bay Gardens was constructed at the time of the opening of the "Towers" in the early 1960s and was open to the public till security concerns about the increasing homeless population prompted the privatizing of the park in 1983, leading to backlash from the surrounding community.

References
Notes

Bibliography

External links 

 Real Estate Site

Brutalist architecture in New York City
I. M. Pei buildings
Kips Bay, Manhattan
Residential skyscrapers in Manhattan
Residential buildings completed in 1965